Chen Xing may refer to:
 Chen Xing (hydrologist) (1921–2009), Chinese hydrologist 
 Mike Chen (Chen Xing, born 1980 or 1981), Chinese-born American YouTuber
 Chen Xing (footballer, born 1983), Chinese footballer 
 Chen Xing (footballer, born 2000), Chinese footballer